Wang Jian is a Chinese powerlifter. He has won multiple medals throughout his twenty-year career.

References

External links
 

Year of birth missing (living people)
Living people
Paralympic powerlifters of China
Chinese powerlifters
Paralympic silver medalists for China
Paralympic medalists in powerlifting
Powerlifters at the 1996 Summer Paralympics
Powerlifters at the 2000 Summer Paralympics
Powerlifters at the 2004 Summer Paralympics
Powerlifters at the 2008 Summer Paralympics
Powerlifters at the 2012 Summer Paralympics
Powerlifters at the 2016 Summer Paralympics
Medalists at the 1996 Summer Paralympics
Medalists at the 2000 Summer Paralympics
Medalists at the 2004 Summer Paralympics
Medalists at the 2012 Summer Paralympics
Medalists at the 2016 Summer Paralympics
21st-century Chinese people